3-Heptanol or heptan-3-ol is an organic alcohol with the chemical formula C7H16O.

3-Heptanol is chiral, so (R)- and (S)- isomers exist.

References

See also
 1-Heptanol
 2-Heptanol
 4-Heptanol

Alkanols